Phtheochroa aegrana is a species of moth of the family Tortricidae. It is found in North America, where it has been recorded from Alberta, Oregon, California and New Mexico.

The wingspan is 14–16 mm. Adults have been recorded on wing from May to August and in January.

References

Moths described in 1879
Phtheochroa